Rhododendron subg. Hymenanthes is a subgenus of the genus Rhododendron, with a widespread distribution in the temperate Northern Hemisphere. The species are evergreen shrubs and small to medium-sized trees (up to 20 m tall), with medium-sized to large leaves (very large, over 40 cm long, in a few species). The flowers are large, produced in terminal trusses of 5-40 together.

The subgenus includes two sections, Rhododendron sect. Ponticum, divided into 24 subsections and about 140 species, and (since 2005) Rhododendron sect. Pentanthera

Section Ponticum (24 subsections)
 R. subsect. Arborea (3 species)
 R. subsect. Argyrophylla (6 species)
 R. subsect. Auriculata (one species, R. auriculatum)
 R. subsect. Barbata (2 species)
 R. subsect. Campanulata (2 species)
 R. subsect. Campylocarpa (4 species)
 R. subsect. Falconera (7 species)
 R. subsect. Fortunea (10 species)
 R. subsect. Fulgensia (2 species)
 R. subsect. Fulva (2 species)
 R. subsect. Glischra (5 species)
 R. subsect. Grandia (9 species)
 R. subsect. Griersoniana (one species, R. griersonianum)
 R. subsect. Irrorata (7 species)
 R. subsect. Lanata (one species, R. lanatum)
 R. subsect. Maculifera (6 species)
 R. subsect. Neriiflora (19 species)
 R. subsect. Parishia (3 species)
 R. subsect. Pontica (13 species)
 R. subsect. Selensia (5 species)
 R. subsect. Taliensia (20 species)
 R. subsect. Thomsonia (7 species)
 R. subsect. Venatora (one species, R. venator)
 R. subsect. Williamsiana (one species, R. williamsianum)
Section Pentanthera (2 subsections)
 R. subsect. Pentanthera (G. Don) Pojarkova (15 species)
 R. subsect. Sinensia (one species: Rhododendron molle)

Cultivation
This subgenus includes the majority of the larger evergreen rhododendrons widely grown as ornamental plants. Some species, notably Rhododendron ponticum, have escaped from cultivation and become invasive in some regions such as New Zealand.

References

Bibliography 
Huxley, A., ed. (1992). New RHS Dictionary of Gardening. Macmillan.

External links 
Germplasm Resources Information Network: Rhododendron subgenus Hymenanthes

Hymenanthes
Plant subgenera